The Best In The World: Non-Stop Special Remix/Alyssa's Singles is the first compilation album from singer Alyssa Milano consisting of remixed singles plus one new song ("The Best in the World"). Released on February 21, 1990, all the tracks are remixed into a continuous mix. This album was also released in a picture disc edition.

The album peaked at number 9 on the Japanese Oricon Albums Chart for a total of eight weeks.

Track listing

Singles

Album credits

Production
Producers: Joey Carbone, Katz Nagasawa, Tom Milano
Arrangers: Joey Carbone, Mark Davis
Engineers: Bill Purse, Bill Smith,  John D’Andrea, Mark Davis, Eddie King, Ross Hogarth, Steve Bates, Craig Doubet
Mixing: Brian Reeves at Oasis Studios
Assistant mixing: Ian Minns
Executive producers: Tom Sassa for Pony Canyon Inc. and Sammy Masada for Marubeni Corporation
Pony Canyon Producer: Masa Shigeno
Management: Sam Kazama and Michael O’Connor

Design
Photography: Michael O’Connor

Chart performance

References

Alyssa Milano compilation albums
1990 remix albums